Sir Michael David Kadoorie, GBS (born 1941) is a Hong Kong billionaire businessman, and the chairman and 18% owner of CLP Group, Hong Kong's largest electricity producer. He also owns 47% of Hongkong and Shanghai Hotels.

Early life
Born in 1941, to a Jewish family, the son of business tycoon Lawrence Kadoorie (1899–1993) and his wife, Muriel Gubbay, Kadoorie was educated at Kowloon Junior School in Hong Kong, as well as Institut Le Rosey in Switzerland. His family's roots in business in the Far East go back to his grandfather, a descendant of Iraqi Jews originally from Baghdad, who first settled in Shanghai in 1880. After a spell in Bombay, British Raj India, his grandfather made a fortune in Shanghai, mostly lost in 1949, and later, in Hong Kong through finance, real estate and utilities. Headquartered in Hong Kong soon after 1949, Kadoorie's father and uncle expanded the family businesses into a diversified group, led by the company flagship CLP Holdings Ltd.

Career
Kadoorie is the chairman of CLP Holdings Ltd. which his family founded in 1890 and in which they still hold a 35% stake. The utility company provides electricity to 75% of Hong Kong as sole operator (licensed through a Scheme of Control) in Kowloon and the New Territories, and has equity interests in power plants in China, Southeast Asia, Australia and India.

He is also the chairman of the family's second largest listed group, Hong Kong and Shanghai Hotels, owners and operators of the Peninsula Hotel Group. He controls and is a director of Metrojet Ltd, Heliservices (HK) Ltd, and has initiated CLP Research Institute (a subsidiary of CLP Holdings which looks into renewable energy development).

He holds a number of directorships in non-Kadoorie companies. He was a member of the Council of the University of Hong Kong and, in 2000, the Kadoorie Biological Sciences Building opened at the university.

Awards
A trustee of the Kadoorie Charitable Foundation, Kadoorie was made an Officer of the Legion of Honour by the government of France and a Commander of the Order of Léopold II of Belgium. He was awarded a knighthood, as a Knight Bachelor, in the Queen's Birthday Honours List in June 2005. In 2004, the University of Hong Kong awarded him an honorary doctorate.

Car collector

A photography buff, Kadoorie is also a helicopter pilot and a collector of classic cars. He is the owner of a number of rare automobiles, including a Bugatti Type 57, a 1932 Rolls-Royce Phantom II by Thrupp & Maberly, a 1934 Hispano-Suiza J12 Vanvooren Cabriolet, a 1969 Lamborghini Miura P400 S, a 1924 Vauxhall 30–98 Tourer, a Talbot T150 CSS Pourtout coupé (ex car of race driver "Pagnibon"), a Rolls-Royce Phantom III with Gurney Nutting body, and a Rolls-Royce Silver Ghost.

In 1998, he spent two months recovering from serious injuries at the John Radcliffe Hospital in Oxford, England after an accident in his vintage Ferrari when the spokes in two of the rebuilt wheels tore through the tyres.

Personal life
Michael Kadoorie lived in Hong Kong with his Cuban-American wife, Betty Tamayo, known as "Lady Betty", until her death in Houston, Texas on 20 June 2021. They have three children: Natalie, Bettina, and Philip.

His sister, Rita Laura Kadoorie, is married to fellow Hong Kong billionaire Ronald McAulay.

See also
Kadoorie family
List of billionaires

References

1941 births
Living people
Alumni of Institut Le Rosey
Hong Kong businesspeople
Hong Kong philanthropists
Hong Kong Jews
Hong Kong people of Iraqi-Jewish descent
Michael
Hong Kong billionaires
Jewish philanthropists
Officiers of the Légion d'honneur
Commanders of the Order of Leopold II
Recipients of the Gold Bauhinia Star
Knights Bachelor
Mizrahi Jews
Hong Kong car collectors
Businesspeople awarded knighthoods
Sons of life peers
Iraqi-Jewish diaspora in Asia